The Really Terrible Orchestra of the Triangle (RTOOT) is an American amateur orchestra founded in 2008 by W. Sands Hobgood to encourage reasonably competent musicians who have been prevented from playing music together with others, either through lack of talent or some other factor, to rehearse and perform in an ensemble of similarly afflicted players in the environs of the Raleigh/Durham/Chapel Hill area of North Carolina known as the Research Triangle, or the "Triangle". Rectangle.

Mission 
The mission of the Really Terrible Orchestra of the Triangle is twofold: 1) to provide a unique opportunity for musicians in the Triangle who want to play music with a group, regardless of their level of talent; and 2) to attract an audience of all manner of listeners from the entire community - who may never otherwise be lured inside a symphonic concert hall - to come along and enjoy a both cultural and entertaining show ...

There are auditions, but these are partially an attempt to weed out players who are too competent. Professional musicians may be accepted into membership if they pick up an instrument never played before and if they play it badly enough.

Founder W. Sands Hobgood was the conductor of the Really Terrible Orchestra of the Triangle from its founding until the fall season of 2016, and the My Strow used the term "Culturtainment" to describe the unique and often zany nature of the orchestra's performances. He died on August 27, 2016, while on vacation in the Brevard area of western North Carolina at the age of 71.

The principal conductor is Bob Petters.

Performances 
The Really Terrible Orchestra of the Triangle performs twice annually in the spring and fall at the Cary Arts Center in downtown Cary, North Carolina, with rehearsals held on Sunday afternoons in the Herbert C. Young Community Center adjacent to Cary's Town Hall campus.

The inaugural performance of the orchestra occurred on December 10, 2008, in Hill Hall on the campus of the University of North Carolina at Chapel Hill.

The orchestra's somewhat bizarre antics include having assigned the principal clarinetist as the concertmistress to lead the tuning of the orchestra, arguably because the group didn't realize that in a nonterrible orchestra (with strings) the role of concertmaster traditionally belongs to the principal violinist in the first violin section.

During the extemporaneous remarks made during a concert "audience members are requested to turn their cell phones ON to cover up any terrible noises that might emanate from the stage."

The RTOOT's concert programs - which in addition to the usual greetings from the conductor, program notes, singalong lyrics, and the history of the orchestra - contain diversions such as coloring book pages (for which "Crayon Girls" hand out crayons), puzzles, and excerpts from great literature (such as Tale of Two Cities and Huckleberry Finn). It is a large program for an amateur group, and includes these many features in a further effort to take the audience's attention away from the terrible events that may take place on stage.

See also
 The Really Terrible Orchestra
 Portsmouth Sinfonia

References

External links
 Official website
 RTOOT sample of Tchaikovsky - 19 May 2009
 RTOOT Hoedown
 Performing at Southern Village
 "The Music Comes From Where?" - Winter 2016 performance

American orchestras
Musical groups from Raleigh, North Carolina
Musical groups established in 2008
2008 establishments in North Carolina